McConnellsville is a hamlet in Oneida County, New York, United States. McConnellsville had a post office from August 2, 1824, until February 26, 1994; it still has its own ZIP code, 13401.

References

Hamlets in Oneida County, New York
Hamlets in New York (state)